Robert F. Logan,  (born May 29, 1941) is an American actor who has appeared in numerous films and television programs, the most notable of which were a successful series of family adventure movies in the 1970s.

Born in the Brooklyn borough of New York City, Logan is the eldest of seven children born to bank executive Francis Logan and Catherine Quigley. Young "R.J." was active in high school sports; he received a baseball scholarship to the University of Arizona at Tucson. There he was spotted by a Warner Bros. talent agent. Logan is recognized by many for his roles in family-oriented films such as the Wilderness Family film series.<ref>[http://www.allmovie.com/artist/robert-logan-p42979 AllMovie: Robert Logan]</ref>

From 1961 to 1963, Logan played J.R. Hale, the young valet parking attendant on ABC's 77 Sunset Strip''. Logan succeeded the previous attendant, Kookie, played by Edward Byrnes, who in the story line became a full-fledged investigator. From 1965-1966, Logan played the part of Jericho Jones on NBC's Daniel Boone.

Filmography

References

External links

1941 births
Living people
Arizona Wildcats baseball players
20th-century American male actors
American male film actors
Male actors from New York City
American male television actors
Male actors from Los Angeles
Warner Bros. contract players
People from Brooklyn